This is a list of buildings that are examples of the Art Deco architectural style in Texas, United States.

Amarillo 
 2500 South Van Buren Street, Amarillo, 1935
 The Derrick Building (former Greyhound Depot), Amarillo, 1949
 Eddie's Napoli's Italian Restaurant, Amarillo, 1930s
 Esquire Jazz Club (former Esquire Theatre), Amarillo, 1947
 J. Marvin Jones Federal Building and United States Courthouse, Amarillo, 1939
 Kress Center City, Amarillo, 1932
 Levine's Department Store, Amarillo, 1936
 Louis H. Smith, Inc. Firestone Store, Amarillo, 1930
 Paramount Theater Building, Amarillo, 1932
 Potter County Courthouse, Amarillo, 1932
 Triangle Motel, Amarillo, 1946
 White and Kirk Department Store (now Amarillo National Bank), Amarillo, 1938

Austin 
 3805 Red River Street, Austin, 1947
 Austin Central Fire Station 1, Austin, 1938
 Austin Daily Tribune Building, Austin, 1941
 Brown Building, Austin, 1938
 Dewitt C. Greer State Highway Building, Austin, 1933
 Scarbrough Building, Austin, 1909 and 1931
 Seaholm Power Plant, Austin, 1928
 State Theater, Austin, 1935
 Texas Memorial Museum, Austin, 1936–1939
 Travis County Courthouse, Austin, 1931
 United States Courthouse, Austin, 1936

Baytown 
 First National Bank of Goose Creek, Baytown, 1948
 Odd Fellows Hall, Baytown, 1929
 St. Joseph Catholic Church, Baytown, 1958

Beaumont 
 First National Bank Building, Beaumont, 1937
 Jack Brooks Federal Building, Beaumont, 1933
 Jefferson County Courthouse, Beaumont, 1931
 Kyle Building, Beaumont, 1931

Bryan 
 Bryan Municipal Building, Bryan, 1929
 First State Bank & Trust, Bryan, 1929
 Old Sinclair Station, Bryan, 1933

Dallas 
 508 Park Avenue, Dallas, 1929
 6851Gaston Avenue, Dallas, 1936
 Bath House Cultural Center, Dallas, 1930
 Cotton Bowl Stadium, Dallas, 1936
 Dallas High School Arts and Sciences Building, Dallas, 1930 and 1941
 Dallas High School Classics Building, Dallas, 1930, 1941
 Dallas Power & Light Building, Dallas, 1931
 Fair Park Station, Dallas, 1936
 Hall of State, Dallas, 1936
 John E. Mitchell Company Plant, Dallas, 1928
 Margaret B. Henderson Elementary School, Dallas, 1941
 Medical Dental Building, Dallas, 1928
 Mercantile National Bank Building, Dallas, 1942
 Texas Theatre, Dallas, 1931
 Tower Petroleum Building, Dallas, 1931
 The Women's Museum, Dallas, 1936

El Paso 
 Coldwell Elementary School, El Paso, 1930
 Fire Station 11, 331 South Santa Fe, El Paso, 1930
 O. T. Bassett Tower, El Paso, 1930
 Pershing Theater (now artist's studio), El Paso, 1940
 Plaza Hotel, El Paso, 1929
 S. H. Kress and Co. Building, El Paso, 1938
 State Theater, 108 E. San Antonio, El Paso, 1914
 United States Court House, El Paso, 1936
 Valley Theater, (former Cine Azteca), El Paso, 1948

Fort Worth 
 American Airways Hangar and Administration Building, Fort Worth, 1933
 Ashton Hotel, Fort Worth, 1915
 Barber's Bookstore, Fort Worth, 1910, 1935
 Blackstone Hotel, Fort Worth, 1929
 Central Fire Station No. 2, Fort Worth, 1930
 Commerce Building, Fort Worth, 1930
 Farrington Field, Fort Worth, 1939
 Fort Worth Masonic Temple, Fort Worth, 1932
 Lone Star Gas Company Building, Fort Worth, 1929
 Palace Theater Block, Fort Worth, 1996
 Public Safety and Courts Building, Fort Worth, 1938
 S. H. Kress and Co. Building, Fort Worth, 1936
 Santa Fe Freight Station, Fort Worth, 1938
 Sinclair Building, Fort Worth, 1930
 Stockyards Movie House, Fort Worth, 1930s
 T&P Station, Fort Worth, 1930
 W. T. Grant Department Store, Fort Worth, 193
 Western Union Building, Fort Worth, 1931
 Will Rogers Memorial Center, Fort Worth, 1936

Galveston 
 Alamo Elementary School (now storage), Galveston, 1935
 Elks Lodge, Galveston, 1940s
 Galveston Railroad Museum (former Santa Fe Building), Galveston, 1932
 Galveston United States Post Office and Courthouse, Galveston, 1937
 Graugnard's Bakery Building, Galveston, 1940
 Medical Arts Building, Galveston, 1929

Houston 
 1940 Air Terminal Museum, Houston, 1940
 333 20th Street Building, Houston, 1952
 Alabama Theatre, Houston, 1939
 Albritton's Eats, Houston, 1945
 Almeda Court Apartments, Houston, 1939
 Bellaire Theatre, West University Place, Houston, 1949
 Brochsteins Inc, Houston, 1940, 1947
 Byrd's Department Store, Houston, 1934
 Cameron Iron Works, Houston, 1935
 City National Bank Building, Houston, 1947
 Clarke & Courts Building (now Tribeca Lofts), Houston, 1936
 Cullen Performance Hall, Houston, 1950
 Dahlgren's Cabinet Shop, Houston, 1940
 Elias Ramirez State Office Building (former Hughes Tool Company, Inc.), Houston, 1942
 Ezekiel W. Cullen Building, University of Houston, Houston, 1946–1950
 Fondren Library, Rice University, Houston, 1946
 Friendswood Junior High, Friendswood, 1939, 1949
 Gonzales Memorial Museum and Amphitheater, Gonzales, 1937
 Great Southwest Building, Houston, 1927
 Gribble Stamp & Stencil Co., Houston, 1948
 Gulf Building/JP Morgan Chase Building, Houston, 1929
 Hamman Exploration Co., Houston, 1940
 Harris County Peden Community Correction Facility, Houston, 1929
 Heights Theater, Houston, 1929
 Houston City Hall, Houston, 1938–39
 Houston Metropolitan Dance Center, Houston, 1941
 Houston National Cemetery, Houston, 1965
 James Coney Island No. 26, Houston, 1992
 JPMorgan Chase Building (former Levy Dry Goods), Houston, 1929
 L. D. Allen Residence, Houston, 1937
 Lamar High School, Houston, 1936
 Lamar-River Oaks Shopping Center, Houston, 1948
 Lawndale Art Center, Houston, 1931
 Lucian L. Lockhart Elementary School (former Congregation Beth Yeshurun Educational Building), Houston, 1949
 Mellie Esperson Building, Houston, 1941
 Merchants and Manufacturers Building, Houston, 1930
 Montrose Townhouse Lofts, Houston, 1997
 Oak Farms Dairy (now Dean Foods), Houston, 1937
 Reserve 101 Bar, Houston, 1935
 River Oaks Theatre, Houston, 1939
 Roy and Lillie Cullen Building, Baylor College of Medicine, Houston, 1948
 Roy G. Cullen Building, University of Houston, Houston, 1938–39
 Stephen F. Austin High School, Houston, 1936
 Temple of Rest, Congregation Beth Israel, Houston, 1935
 Williams Tower, Houston, 1982
 Weingarten's Big Food Market (now West End Shopping Center), Houston, 1941

Lubbock 
 Cactus Theater, Lubbock, 1938
 Carlock Building, Lubbock, 1930
 Lubbock County Jail, Lubbock, 1931

San Angelo 
 Masonic Lodge 570, San Angelo, 1931
 Princess Ice Cream Co., San Angelo, 1931
 San Angelo City Hall, San Angelo, 1928
 Texas Theatre, San Angelo, 1929

San Antonio 
 Alamo Stadium, San Antonio, 1940
 Freeman Coliseum, San Antonio, 1949
 George Washington Carver Library and Auditorium, San Antonio, 1930
 Lerma's Nite Club, San Antonio, 1948
 Martha Roberson Hall, San Antonio, 1939
 San Antonio Express-News Building, San Antonio, 1930

Taylor 
 City Hall, Taylor, 1935
 Howard Theater, Taylor, 1914
 Taylor High School Campus, Taylor, 1923
 Taylor Motor Company, Taylor, 1931

Tyler 
 Blackstone Building, Tyler, 1938
 Jenkins-Harvey Super Service Station and Garage, Tyler, 1929
 Liberty Hall, Tyler, 1930

Other cities 
 431 North Main Street, Borger
 3M Palace Theater, Colorado City
 Andrews County Courthouse, Andrews, 1939
 Beltonian Theatre, Belton, 1900
 Blue Bell Creameries Complex, Brenham, 1911 and 1935
 Brauntex Theatre, New Braunfels, 1942
 Brazoria County Courthouse, Angleton, 1941
 Brownlee Diner/Little Juarez Cafe, Glenrio, 1952
 Brunson Theater, Baytown, 1949
 Burnet County Courthouse, Burnet, 1937
 Butter Krust Bakery, Corpus Christi, 1938
 Celina High School, Celina, 1941
 Chambers County Courthouse, Anahuac, 1937
 Childress County Courthouse, Childress Commercial and Civic Historic District, Childress, 1939
 Cine El Rey, McAllen, 1947
 Clear View High School, Webster, 1939
 Combs–Worley Building, Pampa, 1931
 Corrigan Center (now Harris Health System), Pasadena, 1956
 Corstone Sales Company, Lufkin, 1935
 Cottle County Courthouse, Cottle County Courthouse Historic District, Paducah, 1930
 Crim Theatre, Kilgore, 1938
 Delta County Courthouse, Cooper, 1941
 Edna Theatre, Edna, 1950
 Esquire Theater, Carthage, 1949
 Fannin County Courthouse, Bonham, 1889
 Federal Building, Abilene, 1936
 Fine Arts Theatre (former Texas Theatre), Denton, 1935
 Galvan Ballroom, Corpus Christi, 1950
 Garmon Theatre, Rio Grande City, 1940s
 Graham Post Office, Graham, 1935–1939
 Gregg County Courthouse, Longview, 1932
 Hachar's Department Store, Laredo, 1942
 Hall Furniture Building, Sherman, 1936
 Hamilton County Jail (now Hamilton County Historical Museum), Hamilton, 1938
 Hansford County Courthouse, Spearman, 1931
 Higginbotham–Bartlett Co., Post, 1940s
 Hollingsworth Ford Auto Showroom, Harlingen, 1930
 Hotel Faust, New Braunfels, 1929
 Hotel McCartney, Texarkana, 1929
 Hotel Marshall, Marshall, 1929
 Houston County Courthouse, Crockett, 1938
 J. P. Lenoir Elementary, Donna, 1925
 Jacksonville Post Office, Jacksonville, 1933
 La Salle County Courthouse, Cotulla, 1931
 Lan-Tex Theatre, Llano, 1927
 Lance Theatre, Rotan
 Liberty County Courthouse, Liberty, 1931
 Loving County Courthouse, Mentone, 1935
 Masonic Lodge, Grandfalls, 1930s or 1940s
 Maverick County Jail, Eagle Pass, 1949
 Menard County Courthouse, Menard, 1931
 Morley Theatre, Borger, 1947
 National Theater, Graham, 1941
 Nocona Athletic Goods Company, Nocona, 1925
 Orange County Courthouse, Orange, 1937
 Palace Theater, Childress Commercial and Civic Historic District, Childress, 1937
 Palace Theatre (former Marfa Opera House), Marfa
 Palace Theater, Seguin, 1938
 Paris Community Theatre (former Palace Theatre), Paris, 1926
 Pearland School (now Alvin Community College – Pearland Campus), Pearland, 1945
 People's National Bank Building, Tyler, 1932
 Phipps Memorial, Waco, 1939
 Pines Theater, Lufkin, 1925
 Plainview Hardware Company Building, Perryton, 1930
 Plaza Arts Center, Carrollton, 1949
 Plaza Theatre, Garland, 1941
 Plaza Theatre, Laredo, 1946
 Randolph Air Force Base Administration Building, Universal City, 1931
 Refugio County Courthouse, Refugio, 1917 and 1951
 Rialto Theater, Alice, 1940
 Rialto Theater, Beeville, 1936
 Rialto Theater, Three Rivers, 1948
 Rig Theater, Wink, 1928
 Rio Grande Telephone Company, Brownsville, 1931
 San Jacinto Monument, Harris County, 1939
 Settles Hotel, Big Spring, 1930
 South County Office Building, Port Arthur, 1936
 Tarver Abstract Company Building (former First National Bank), Liberty, 1932
 Texas State Bank, Alice, 1912 and 1940
 Texaco Station, Glenrio, 1950
 Texas Theater, Ballinger, 1928
 Texas Theatre, McGregor, 1912
 Texas Theatre, Waxahachie, 1914 and 1927
 Tower Theatre, Lamesa, 1930s
 U-Drop Inn, Shamrock, 1936
 United States Post Office - Pampa Main, Pampa, 1934
 Universal Manufacturing Company Building, Abilene, 1927
 Upshur County Courthouse, Gilmer, 1937
 Uptown Theatre, Grand Prairie, 1950
 Van Zandt County Courthouse, Canton, 1937
 Vernon Plaza Theatre, Vernon, 1953
 W. R. Banks Library, Prairie View, 1946
 Waggoner Ranch, Vernon, 1923
 Washington County Courthouse, Brenham, 1939

See also 
 List of Art Deco architecture
 List of Art Deco architecture in the United States

References 

 "Art Deco & Streamline Moderne Buildings." Roadside Architecture.com. Retrieved 2019-01-03.
 Cinema Treasures. Retrieved 2022-09-06
 "Court House Lover". Flickr. Retrieved 2022-09-06
 Highland, Brittany. "Inherit Austin Tours Historic Downtown Deco Worth Keeping". The Austinot. 2012-09-25. Retrieved 2019-01-17.
 "Houston Deco". Preservation Houston. Retrieved 2019-01-17.
 "New Deal Map". The Living New Deal. Retrieved 2020-12-25.
 "SAH Archipedia". Society of Architectural Historians. Retrieved 2021-11-21.
 "Walking Tour of Downtown Fort Worth." Fort Worth Architecture. Retrieved 2022-09-06\

External links
 

 
Art Deco
Art Deco architecture in Texas
Texas-related lists